Kevin Lynch (25 May 1956 – 1 August 1981) was an Irish republican and member of the Irish National Liberation Army (INLA) from Park, County Londonderry, Northern Ireland. The Dungiven hurling team was renamed Kevin Lynch's Hurling Club in his honour after his death on hunger strike.

Early life

Lynch was the youngest in a family of eight children born to Paddy and Bridie Lynch in Park, north County Londonderry.

Lynch's older brother, Frank, was an amateur boxer and he also participated in the sport as well as Gaelic football and hurling. Lynch was a member of the winning Dungiven team which won the Feile na nGael Division 3 in Thurles , County Tipperary in 1971 and in 1972 he captained the Derry Hurling team to an Under-16 All-Ireland title at Croke Park, Dublin by defeating County Armagh.

INLA career
Lynch was tried, convicted and sentenced to ten years for stealing shotguns, taking part in a punishment shooting and conspiring to take arms from the security forces. He was sent to the Maze Prison in December 1977. He became involved with the blanket protest, joined the 1981 hunger strike at the Maze on 23 May 1981 and died 71 days later.

Other information
Kelly and the other hunger strikers are commemorated on the Irish Patriots and Martyrs of 1798, 1916 and 1981 Memorial in Waverley Cemetery in Sydney, Australia.

References

 Hegarty, Aidan Kevin Lynch and the Irish Hunger Strike, Camlane Press, 2006

External links
Biography from IRIS, Vol. 1, No. 2, November 1981 (Sinn Féin publication)
Biography from the Irish Republican Socialist Movement

1956 births
1981 deaths
Derry inter-county hurlers
Dungiven hurlers
Dungiven Gaelic footballers
Irish male boxers
Irish National Liberation Army members
Irish republicans
Male boxers from Northern Ireland
People who died on the 1981 Irish hunger strike